Swedish Grand Prix can refer to:

Swedish Grand Prix, a Formula One motor race
Swedish Summer Grand Prix, an auto race, predecessor of the above Swedish Grand Prix (q.v.)
Swedish Winter Grand Prix, an auto race on the ice of Lake Rämen
Swedish Grand Prix - Class 1, an UIM Class 1 powerboat offshore race
Swedish motorcycle Grand Prix
Speedway Grand Prix of Sweden